The 2001 COPABA Tournament of the Americas, later known as the FIBA Americas Championship and the FIBA AmeriCup (also as the Championship of the Americas for Men), was hosted by Argentina, from 16 August, to 26 August 2001. The games were played at the Estadio Ruca Che, Neuquén. This FIBA AmeriCup was to earn berths at the 2002 FIBA World Championship, in Indianapolis, Indiana, United States. Argentina won the tournament, the country's first AmeriCup championship. The United States performed poorly at this tournament, mainly because it sent in junior players.

Venue

Qualification 
 North America: , 
 Caribbean and Central America:, 

The draw split the tournament into two groups:

Group A

Group B

Format 
 The top four teams from each group advance to the quarterfinals.
 Results and standings among teams within the same group are carried over.
 The top four teams at the quarterfinals advance to the semifinals (1 vs. 4, 2 vs. 3).
 The top five teams from the quarterfinals stage were granted berths in the 2002 FIBA World Championship in Indianapolis. Since the United States were already qualified as Olympic Champions, should they reach the semifinals stage, the sixth-best team from the quarterfinals also qualified to the World Championship.
 The winners in the knockout semifinals advance to the Final. The losers figure in a third-place playoff.

Squads

Preliminary round

Group A 

|}

Group B 

|}

Quarterfinal group 

The top four teams in both Group A and Group B advanced to the quarterfinal group. Then, each team played the four from the other group once to complete a full round robin. Records from the preliminary groups carried over.

|}

Knockout stage

Awards

Final standings

References

External links 
 2001 Championship of the Americas for Men, FIBA.com.
 Infos at latinbasket.com

FIBA AmeriCup
2001 in Argentine sport
International basketball competitions hosted by Argentina
2001–02 in North American basketball
2001–02 in South American basketball
Sport in Neuquén Province